Nordåsvannet or Nordåsvatnet is a bay in Bergen Municipality in central Vestland county, Norway. The entire fjord, consisting of the Grimstadfjorden and Nordåsvannet, is known as the Fjøsangerfjorden.

The Bergen neighborhoods of Søreidegrenda, Nesttun, Paradis, Fjøsanger, Bønestoppen, and Straume are all located on the shores of Nordåsvannet.  The Gamlehaugen mansion is located on the shores of the bay.  Gamlehaugen is one of the Norwegian King's royal residences.

References

Fjords of Vestland
Geography of Bergen